Betul district is a district of Madhya Pradesh state in central India. The city of Betul serves as its administrative headquarters. The district is a part of Narmadapuram Division.

It lies almost wholly on the Satpura range and occupies nearly the whole width of the range between the Narmada Valley on the north and the Berar plains on the south.

History 
Little is known of the early history of the district except that it must have been the centre of the first of the four ancient Gond kingdoms of Kherla, Deogarh, Garha-Mandla and Chanda-Sirpur. According to Ferishta, the Persian historian, these kingdoms engrossed in 1398 all the hills of Gondwana and adjacent countries, and were of great wealth and power. About the year 1418 Sultan Hoshang Shah of Malwa invaded Kherla, and reduced it to a dependency. Nine years later the Raja rebelled, but although with the help of the Bahmani kings of the Deccan he managed for a time to assert his independence, he was finally subdued and deprived of his territories. In 1467 Kherla was seized by the Bahmani sultan, but was afterwards restored to Malwa. A century later the kingdom of Malwa became incorporated into the dominions of the emperor of Delhi. In 1703 a Muslim convert of the Gond tribe held the country, and in 1743 Raghoji Bhonsle, the Maratha ruler of Berar, annexed it to his dominions.

The Marathas in the year 1818 ceded this district to the East India Company as payment for a contingent, and by the treaty of 1826 it was formally incorporated with the British possessions. The district was administered as part of the Saugor and Nerbudda Territories until 1861, when the territories were incorporated into the Central Provinces. Betul District was also part of the Nerbudda (Narmada) Division of the Central Provinces and Berar, which became the state of Madhya Bharat (later Madhya Pradesh) after India's independence in 1947.

Detachments of British troops were stationed at Multai, Betul and Shahpur to cut off the retreat of Appa Sahib, the Maratha general, and a military force was quartered at Betul until June 1862. The ruined city of Kherla formed the seat of government under the Gonds and preceding rulers, and hence the district was, until the time of its annexation to the British dominions, known as the "Kherla Sarkar." The town of Multai contains an artificial tank, from the centre of which the Tapti is said to take its rise; hence the reputed sanctity of the spot, and the accumulation of temples in its honour.

This district suffered very severely from the famine of 1896–1897, in 1897 the death-rate being as high as 73 per 1000. It suffered again in 1900, when in May the number of persons relieved rose to one-third of the total population. In 1901 the population was 285,363, showing a decrease of 12% in the decade, due to the results of famine.

In 1901 the population of the town was 4,739. The administrative headquarters of the district were transferred to the town of Badnur, 3 miles north. At the beginning of the 20th century, the principal crops in the district were wheat, soybean, millet, other food-grains, pulse, oil-seeds, and a little sugar-cane and cotton.

Geography 
The mean elevation above the sea is about 2000 ft. The country is essentially a highland tract, divided naturally into three distinct portions, differing in their superficial aspects, the character of their soil and their geological formation. The northern part of the district forms an irregular plain of the sandstone formation. It is a well-wooded tract, but it has a very sparse population and little cultivated land. In the extreme north a line of hills rises abruptly out of the great plain of the Narmada valley. The central tract alone possesses a rich soil, well watered by the river Machna and Sapna dam, almost entirely cultivated and studded with villages. To the south lies a rolling plateau of basaltic formation (with the sacred town of Multai, and the springs of the Tapti River at its highest point), extending over the whole of the southern face of the district, and finally merging into the wild and broken line of the Ghats, which lead down to the plains. This tract consists of a succession of stony ridges of trap rock, enclosing valleys or basins of fertile soil, to which cultivation is for the most part confined, except where the shallow soil on the tops of the hills has been turned to account.

The climate of Betul is fairly healthy. Its height above the plains and the neighbourhood of extensive forests moderate the heat, and render the temperature pleasant throughout the greater part of the year. During the cold season the thermometer at night falls below the freezing point; little or no hot wind is felt before the end of April, and even then it ceases after sunset. The nights in the hot season are comparatively cool and pleasant. During the monsoon the climate is very damp, and at times even cold and raw, thick clouds and mist enveloping the sky for many days together. The average annual rainfall is 1080mm.

Betul district is rich in forests and biodiversity. The main timber species of Betul Forest is Teak. Many miscellaneous types of trees such as Haldu, Saja , Dhaoda etc. are also found in abundance. Many medicinal plants are also found in the forest areas of Betul. Large amounts of commercially important minor forest produce such as Tendu leaves, chironji, Harra, Amla are also collected from the forests of Betul. Asia's biggest wood depot is in Betul.

The major rivers flowing in the district are the Ganjal River, Morand River and the Tawa River (tributaries of the Narmada River). The Tapti river originates from Multai in the Betul district; Multai's Sanskrit name 'Multapi' means 'origin of Tapi or the River Tapti'.

Demographics 

According to the 2011 census Betul district has a population of 1,575,362, roughly equal to the nation of Gabon or the US state of Idaho. This gives it a ranking of 314th in India (out of a total of 640). Its population growth rate over the decade 2001–2011 was 6.85%. Betul has a sex ratio of 970 females for every 1000 males, and a literacy rate of 70.14%. 19.62% of the population lives in urban areas. Scheduled Castes and Scheduled Tribes made up 10.11% and 42.34% of the population respectively.

Religion 

Hindus are by far the most numerous with 95.58% and Muslims are 2.39%. The third largest community are the Buddhists who were 9600 in number.

Languages 

At the time of the 2011 Census of India, 44.69% of the population in the district spoke Hindi, 27.69% Gondi, 12.86% Marathi, 11.13% Korku and 1.69% Bengali as their first language.

The district is rich in tribal population. Main tribes inhabiting the district are Gonds and Korkus. The remaining population is Marathi including castes like Marathas, Pawars, Kunbis, Brahmins, Chamars, Mali, Pal, Patil and Soni.

Administration 
Betul railway station is located between Bhopal and Nagpur station.

The district is divided into 8 tehsils -

 Bhainsdehi
 Athner
 Chicholi
 Betul
 Shahpur
 Multai
 Ghoradongri
 Bordehi
 Amla

Economy 
In 2006 the Ministry of Panchayati Raj named Betul one of the country's 250 most backward districts (out of a total of 640). It was one of the 24 districts in Madhya Pradesh previously receiving funds from the Backward Regions Grant Fund Programme (BRGF).

Attractions 

Atari - is a village which is near to Chicholi and there is a very old and famous temple and known as GOV Dev baba temple. It created by "Verma" family from village community.

Old Village Rondha :  Rondha's most ancient village in Betul district, one of the most massive white Sangmarmar is made of stone Lord Shiv Vahan Nandi sitting. The village has more than hundred years old trees of Champa. The village is said about Sant Tukado Ji Maharaj and Sarwodayi opinion influenced by Vinoba Bhave's Bhoodan leader. Here, look at the lion's legendary mansion, of champa trees, giant ficus, Chat Manth Gondi Jatara dominant mass is Gondi. Hindi journalism around Rondha Sntb Ramkishoar Pawar's native village green - green Lhlhate farm.day's Halt in thish Places

Balajipuram temple located to 8 km from main city and it is famous for its design and people faith. This is a place of religious value as well as a picnic spot in Betul.
Shri Rukmani Balaji Temple is situated at Betul Bazaar, in Betul District of Madhya Pradesh. This temple, dedicated to Lord Balaji, gives this town a reference name, Balajipuram.
The main building of the Shri Rukmani Balaji Temple conforms to the architecture used in south Indian temples. Reputed architects from south India were involved in the design work. Individual sections in the temple resemble smaller temples, enshrining idols of Lord Ganesh, Radha-Krishna, Goddess Durga and Lord Shiva. The main deity is referred by the name Laxmi Narayan.

Situated outside the main building are 3 smaller temples dedicated to Hanuman Ji and Navagraha. There is an artificial pond named Gangakund, stretching from outside gate to the main building, which contains a total of 10 fountains. Another major attraction is a python shaped structure, which is actually a tunnel leading to all the shrines in the complex.

The temple was inaugurated in the presence of the major religious heads from all over the country. The sanctifying ceremony was held from 29 January to 4 February 2001.

The trust managing this temple provides free accommodation with basic facilities for the pilgrims. Free bus facility is available to and fro to the railway station and bus stand. Betul Bazaar can be reached via Betul, which is situated on the National Highway 69.

Kukru is a village in Bhainsdehi Tehsil in Betul district of Madhya Pradesh state, India. It belongs to Narmadapuram Division. It is located 46 km towards South from District headquarters Betul. The Narmada Hydroelectric Development Corporation (NHDC) has run into rough weather over a wind power project. NHDC is a joint venture between the Madhya Pradesh government and the National Hydro Power Corporation (NHPC). Last year, it had planned to set up a 100-MW wind power plant in Kukru village.

References

the betul is the startiting point of ma tapi river from multai the sarover

External links

 Official website

 
Districts of Madhya Pradesh